Mahel of Hereford was a holder of the feudal lordships of Brecon and Abergavenny in the Welsh Marches in the mid 12th century.

Lineage 

Mahel of Hereford was a younger son of Miles of Gloucester, 1st Earl of Hereford and his wife Sibyl of Neufmarche, daughter of Bernard de Neufmarche, Lord of Brecon.

His brothers were Walter and William of Hereford.

Offices 

Mahel held the posts of King's Constable in the region and succeeded to the lordships of Brecon and Abergavenny in 1163. In 1163 or 1164 he attended the Council of Clarendon.

He died about 1164, without issue, and is buried at Llanthony Priory, Monmouthshire.

External links 
The Peerage on Mahel de Hereford

Anglo-Normans in Wales
1160s deaths
Burials at Llanthony Secunda Priory, Gloucester
Year of birth unknown
Feudal barons of Abergavenny
Younger sons of earls